Glogovo Passage (‘Protok Glogovo’ \'pro-tok 'glo-go-vo\) is the 110 metre wide passage between Zverino Island on the west-southwest and Cave Island on the east-northeast in the Meade group off Archar Peninsula, the northwest extremity of Greenwich Island in the South Shetland Islands, Antarctica.

The passage is named after the settlement of Glogovo in Northern Bulgaria.

Location
British mapping in 1968 and Bulgarian mapping in 2009.

Maps
Livingston Island to King George Island.  Scale 1:200000.  Admiralty Nautical Chart 1776.  Taunton: UK Hydrographic Office, 1968.
 L.L. Ivanov. Antarctica: Livingston Island and Greenwich, Robert, Snow and Smith Islands. Scale 1:120000 topographic map. Troyan: Manfred Wörner Foundation, 2009.  (Second edition 2010)
Antarctic Digital Database (ADD). Scale 1:250000 topographic map of Antarctica. Scientific Committee on Antarctic Research (SCAR). Since 1993, regularly upgraded and updated.

References
 Bulgarian Antarctic Gazetteer. Antarctic Place-names Commission. (details in Bulgarian, basic data in English)
 Glogovo Passage. SCAR Composite Antarctic Gazetteer.

External links
 Glogovo Passage. Copernix satellite image

Bodies of water of Greenwich Island
Bulgaria and the Antarctic
Straits of the South Shetland Islands